Christo John du Plessis (born 2 June 1989 in George, South Africa) is a South African rugby union player who most recently played the . His regular position is flanker or number eight.

Career

Youth and amateur rugby

As a scholar playing rugby for George High School, Du Plessis was selected for the  side that played at the 2007 Under-18 Craven Week tournament.

In 2008, he moved to Virginia to join the Harmony Sports Academy. He also represented the  side in the 2008 Under-19 Provincial Championship, (which was the South African junior competition won by any Griffons side) and he was named their Forward of the Year.

He returned to George in 2009 where he was named in the  side that played in the 2009 Under-21 Provincial Championship.

He also played some club rugby for Blanco between 2010 and 2012.

SWD Eagles

His introduction to first class rugby came during the 2010 Vodacom Cup competition when he was one of a number of club players that were included in the SWD Eagles squad for the competition.

Blanco / Evergreens

However, he then fell out of the provincial set-up and reverted to playing amateur rugby for local club side Blanco in 2011 and 2012, also captaining the side as they qualified for the National Club Championships in 2012.

He made a single appearance for the SWD Eagles in the 2012 Vodacom Cup, playing the last 20 minutes of their match against .

He joined Pacaltsdorp-based club side Evergreens in 2013 and made two appearances for them in the 2013 SARU Community Cup competition, also scoring a try in their match against White River from Mpumalanga.

SWD Eagles (2013–)

He established himself as a first-choice player, starting ten matches for the Eagles during the 2013 Currie Cup First Division competition and playing off the bench twice.

References

South African rugby union players
Living people
1989 births
People from George, South Africa
Rugby union flankers
Rugby union number eights
SWD Eagles players
Rugby union players from the Western Cape